The Lion is a 2010 novel by American author Nelson DeMille. It is the fifth of DeMille's novels to feature Detective John Corey, now working as a contractor for the fictional FBI Anti-Terrorist Task Force in New York City. The novel is the sequel to The Lion's Game. The Lion is followed by DeMille's 2012 novel, The Panther.

External links

Novels by Nelson DeMille
2010 American novels
Sequel novels
Grand Central Publishing books